The 1982 All Ireland Camogie Championship was won by Cork, beating Dublin by a single point in the final.

Early rounds
Edel Murphy scored 1-6 and Marion Conroy another goal as Dublin withstood a late Limerick comeback to win the semi-final by three points. Three first half goals by Val Fitzpatrick helped Cork draw with Kilkenny, for whom Angela Downey scored 1-10 and Bridie McGarry equalised from a sideline ball 25 yards from the left corner flag three minutes from the end, the third draw in the championship between the teams since 1974. Cathy Landers had to score a point from midfield to give Cork victory, just as Helena O'Neill had been faced with a similar free to equalise in 1974. Helena succeeded, Cathy did not. The replay was attended by a large crowd (it was claimed that all three semi-finals had record attendances for this stage but records are incomplete) and finished Cork 5-4 to 3-10 before 20 minutes of extra time was required to separate the sides. Cork scored 2-4 to Kilkenny’s 0-2 in extra time. Their goals came from Mary Geaney and Pat Lenihan (two each), Mary O'Leary who scored 1-8, Marion McCarthy and Marion Sweeney.

Final
A dramatic point from a 50-yard free in the last minute by Mary O'Leary leaving Dublin lamenting their third defeat in a final in six years. It followed the decisive goal with five minutes to go when Mary O'Leary collected the ball 50 yards from goal and sent in a hard driven shot which dipped below the crossbar. O'Leary scored 1-6 in a fast paced game. Marion McCarthy scored a Dublin goal from the edge of the square after 54 seconds, Cork attacked from the restart and when Yvonne Redmond was slow to clear Pat Lenihan scored a Cork goal after just 90 seconds to complete the quickest two goals in All Ireland camogie history, Una Crowley then had Dublin's second goal after seven minutes and Dublin led 2-5 to 1-3 at half time.

Final stages

MATCH RULES
50 minutes
Replay if scores level
Maximum of 3 substitutions

See also
 All-Ireland Senior Hurling Championship
 Wikipedia List of Camogie players
 National Camogie League
 Camogie All Stars Awards
 Ashbourne Cup

References

External links
 Official Camogie website
 History of Camogie senior championship slideshow. presented by Cumann Camógaíochta Communications Committee at GAA Museum January 25, 2010 part one, part two, part three and part four
 Historic newspaper reports of All Ireland finals
 Camogie on official GAA website
 Timeline: History of Camogie
 Camogie on GAA Oral History Project
 Camogie Websites for Antrim and Dublin

1982 in camogie
1982